Dundee cake is a traditional Scottish fruit cake.

Ingredients
Dundee cake is often made with butter, sugar, lemon zest, orange zest, marmalade, flour, baking powder, eggs, milk, dried fruit, glacé cherries, candied citrus peel, currants, sultanas, ground almonds, and blanched almonds.

History
The original commercial development of the cake began in Dundee in the late 18th century in the shop of Janet Keiller  but was possibly originally made for Mary, Queen of Scots in the 16th century. It was mass-produced by the marmalade company Keiller's marmalade who have been claimed to be the originators of the term "Dundee cake". However, similar fruit cakes were produced throughout Scotland. A popular story is that Mary Queen of Scots did not like glacé cherries in her cakes, so the cake was first made for her, as a fruit cake that used blanched almonds and not cherries. The top of the cake is typically decorated with concentric circles of almonds. The cakes are sold in   United Kingdom supermarkets.

The cake was also made and marketed in British India, and in independent India after 1947, by Britannia Industries and its successor firms. However, after 1980, the cake was withdrawn from the market though it continued to be supplied privately as a corporate Christmas gift by the maker.

Recognition 
Queen Elizabeth II was reported to favour Dundee cake at tea-time.

In The Gathering Storm, Winston Churchill is depicted as a keen fan of the Dundee cake.

See also
 Scottish cuisine

References

External links

Traditional Dundee Cake — Delia Online
Dundee cake recipe — The Hairy Bikers
Dundee cake recipe — BBC Good Food
Dundee cake recipe — Good Housekeeping

British cakes
Scottish desserts
Food and drink introduced in the 19th century